Nora Strømstad (January 26, 1909 – January 6, 2005) was a Norwegian alpine skier who competed in the 1936 Winter Olympics. She was the younger sister of 1924 Winter Olympics skier Thoralf Strømstad.

In 1936 she finished eleventh in the alpine skiing combined event.

References

External links
 Alpine skiing 1936 

1909 births
2005 deaths
Norwegian female alpine skiers
Olympic alpine skiers of Norway
Alpine skiers at the 1936 Winter Olympics